Vice Admiral Sir Charles Christopher Morgan  (born 11 March 1939) is a former Royal Navy officer who became Naval Secretary.

Naval career
Educated at the Royal Naval College, Dartmouth, Morgan joined the Royal Navy in 1959 and was involved in the First Cod War with Iceland in 1960. He also saw action during the Kuwait crisis in 1961, the Brunei Revolt in 1962 and the Indonesia–Malaysia confrontation in 1962. He was given command of the frigate HMS Eskimo in 1976 and, having been promoted to Captain, he joined the Operational Requirements Division at the Ministry of Defence in 1981 and was given command of the destroyer HMS Southampton in 1986. He became Naval Secretary in 1990 and Flag Officer Scotland, Northern England and Northern Ireland in 1992 before retiring in 1996.

In retirement he was appointed Director-General of the UK Chamber of Shipping.

References

|-

1939 births
Royal Navy vice admirals
Knights Commander of the Order of the British Empire
Living people
British military personnel of the Indonesia–Malaysia confrontation